Fjotland is a village in Kvinesdal municipality in Agder county, Norway. The village is located in the northern part of the Kvinesdalen valley on the northeast side of the lake Fjotlandsvatnet. Fjotland was the administrative centre of the old municipality of Fjotland which existed prior to 1963. Fjotland Church is located in the village.

Name
The name of the municipality (originally the parish) comes from the old Fjotland farm (Old Norse: Fjósaland). The first element in the name comes from the word fjøs which means "barn" and the last element in the name comes from the word land which means "land".

References

External links
Weather information for Fjotland 

Villages in Agder
Kvinesdal